The 2004–05 Second League of Serbia and Montenegro – Group Serbia (Serbian: Друга лига Србије и Црне Горе 2004/05 – група Србија, Druga liga Srbije i Crne Gore 2004/05 – grupa Srbija) consisted of 20 teams. Two teams were promoted to the Serbia and Montenegro SuperLiga and six were relegated the Serbian League.

League table

Relegation play-offs
First legs were player on 3 July and second legs on 6 July 2005.

External links
Druga liga at Srbijasport
Tables and results at RSSSF

Serbian First League seasons
2004–05 in Serbian football
Serbia